Air chief marshal Sir John Gilbert Davis,  (24 March 1911 – 3 February 1989) was a Royal Air Force officer who served as Air Officer Commanding-in-Chief RAF Training Command from 1968 to 1969.

RAF career
Davis joined the Royal Air Force in 1933. He became a pilot and then attended specialist training in navigation before being appointed a Navigation Staff Officer at Headquarters RAF Training Command in 1939. He served in the Second World War, initially on secondment to the Turkish Air Force and then as Officer Commanding No. 269 Squadron.

After the war he attended RAF Staff College and then joined the directing staff there. He was appointed Group Captain, Air Plans at Headquarters Middle East Air Force in 1951, Station Commander at RAF Topcliffe in 1953 and Director of Plans at the Air Ministry in 1955. He went on to be Senior Air Staff Officer at Headquarters RAF Bomber Command in 1958, Air Officer Commanding No. 1 Group in 1959 and Air Officer Commanding RAF Malta in 1961. His last appointments were as Air Member for Supply and Organisation in 1963, Air Officer Commanding-in-Chief at RAF Flying Training Command in 1966 and Air Officer Commanding-in-Chief at RAF Training Command in 1968 before retiring in 1969.

In retirement he became Lieutenant Governor of Jersey.

References

|-

|-

|-

|-

1911 births
1989 deaths
Alumni of Queens' College, Cambridge
Governors of Jersey
Knights Grand Cross of the Order of the Bath
Knights of the Order of St John
Officers of the Order of the British Empire
People from Whitby
Royal Air Force air marshals
Royal Air Force personnel of World War II
Military personnel from Yorkshire